The South Eastern Zone is a zone in the Tigray Region of Ethiopia. The South Eastern Zone is bordered on the south by the Southern Zone, on the southeast by the Amhara Region, on the northeast by the Central Zone, on the north by the Eastern Zone, on the east by the Afar Region, and it surrounds the enclaved Mekelle Special Zone. The South Eastern Zone was separated from the Southern Zone.

Demographics 
As the zone was created after the census of 2007, it is hard to find correct data about the population of the zone. The estimated size of population according to 2007 census conducted by the CSA is 392,142, of which 21,125 or 5.39% were urban dwellers.

Notes 

Tigray Region
Zones of Ethiopia